UFCU may refer to:

UFCU Disch-Falk Field, the baseball field of the University of Texas at Austin
United Federal Credit Union, a credit union in Michigan
University Federal Credit Union, a credit union in Utah
University Federal Credit Union Texas, a credit union in Austin, TX